Gothika is a 2003 American supernatural psychological horror-thriller film directed by Mathieu Kassovitz, written by Sebastian Gutierrez, and starring Halle Berry, Robert Downey Jr., Penélope Cruz, Charles S. Dutton, John Carroll Lynch, and Bernard Hill. The film follows a psychiatrist who finds herself incarcerated in the penitentiary in which she works, accused of brutally murdering her own husband.

The fourth project developed by production company Dark Castle Entertainment, following 2002's Ghost Ship, Gothika was the second film by the company to be co-distributed by Warner Bros. and Columbia Pictures, the first being Thirteen Ghosts. It was also the first feature by Dark Castle to boast a number of high-profile stars in its lead roles.

Gothika was shot in Montreal, Quebec in the spring of 2003. It was released theatrically in the United States on November 21, 2003, the Friday before Thanksgiving. The film grossed $141.6 million internationally, though it received generally negative reviews from critics.

Plot
Dr. Miranda Grey, a psychiatrist at Woodward Penitentiary in rural western Connecticut, crashes her car one night on a country road to avoid hitting a young woman. When she awakens, she finds herself an inmate of the women's ward in which she works, receiving treatment from her colleague, Dr. Pete Graham. Miranda is horrified when Pete reveals to her that her husband, Douglas, has been the victim of a brutal axe murder, and that she is the sole suspect. As Miranda attempts to adjust to life as an inmate, she is haunted by visions of the young woman she saw the night of the car accident, and is attacked by her apparition in the showers; the woman carves the phrase "Not Alone" into Miranda's arm, though the hospital staff presume Miranda is self-harming. She later learns that the same phrase was scrawled in Douglas's blood inside their home after his murder. Miranda meets with her lawyer and start preparing for her defense and they bring in Douglas's best friend, Sheriff Bob Ryan, who confronts Miranda in the penitentiary, accusing her of the murder.

Miranda begins to bond with fellow inmate Chloe Sava, whom she treated prior to her incarceration. During Miranda's previous sessions with Chloe, Chloe claimed to have been raped in the hospital. One night, Miranda's cell door inexplicably opens, and she quietly prowls through the ward. As she passes Chloe's cell, she witnesses Chloe being raped, and glimpses a tattoo of an Anima Sola on the perpetrator's chest. She is subsequently found by guards, who disbelieve her story. As time passes, Miranda regains memories of the night of the car accident, and subsequently identifies the mysterious woman as Rachel, the daughter of Miranda's superior, Dr. Phil Parsons; she had died in an apparent suicide several years prior. Late one night, Miranda is attacked by Rachel's ghost in her cell, and subsequently manages to escape from the hospital. She returns to her home and observes the blood-stained crime scene. This triggers vivid memories of Miranda committing Douglas's murder, though she believes that Rachel possessed her to carry out the act.

Recalling that Douglas mentioned he was going to visit his rural farmhouse in Rhode Island prior to his murder, Miranda decides to visit the site, hoping it will contain clues. While investigating a cellar in the barn, she finds a blood-stained mattress, along with containers of sedatives, restraints, and video recording equipment. Miranda views one of the tapes: It is a snuff film shot by Douglas, which shows him raping, torturing, and murdering a young woman. Police subsequently arrive at the property, arresting Miranda and finding one of Douglas's victims, Tracey Seaver, still alive in the barn. Miranda realizes that Rachel possessed her to avenge her own murder by Douglas.

Incarcerated in the county jail, Miranda converses with Sheriff Ryan about Douglas's crimes, and asserts that Rachel's suicide was staged; she also espouses her belief that a second perpetrator was involved. Using her expertise as a psychiatrist, Miranda constructs a psychological profile of the second perpetrator, and realizes it is in fact Sheriff Ryan. Ryan, realizing Miranda has identified him, attempts to inject her with a sedative. In the struggle, Miranda tears at his shirt, revealing the Anima Sola tattoo on his chest. Miranda manages to turn the syringe on Ryan before fleeing. In a drugged state, Ryan pursues Miranda through the jail, ranting proudly about his and Douglas's crimes; he tells her that Rachel was their first victim, and that they worked together to abduct, rape, and murder a string of local women. Suddenly, Rachel's apparition appears, distracting Ryan. He begins to shoot at it, causing a gas leak and subsequent explosion that sets him ablaze. Miranda obtains his gun, and shoots the burned Ryan to death. Moments later Pete arrives at the jail to try to save her, having realized the truth.

Approximately a year later, Miranda, now freed, walks with Chloe, also released from the penitentiary, on a city sidewalk. Miranda claims to be free of Rachel's influence and sends Chloe off in a taxi. Miranda then sees a young boy standing in the middle of the road who appears as though he is about to be struck by a fire truck. Miranda yells for the boy to move, but after the fire truck passes through the boy without harming him, she realizes he was only a ghost. As Miranda walks away, she fails to notice a missing person flyer for the young boy on a nearby telephone pole.

Cast

Production
The fourth feature film produced by Dark Castle Entertainment, Gothika was the first to boast a high-profile leading cast, and was the company's largest-scale production at the time, with a budget of approximately $40 million.

Berry was partly inspired to take the role because her mother, a nurse, worked in a psychiatric hospital for decades.

Filming took place in Montreal, Quebec, Canada in the spring of 2003. Shooting of Berry's sequences was temporarily halted for several weeks in May 2003, after Robert Downey Jr., while filming a tense scene with Berry, grabbed and twisted her arm, accidentally breaking it.

Soundtrack
The score's original music was composed by John Ottman. "Behind Blue Eyes" by Limp Bizkit (originally by The Who) was featured in the film but was not available on the soundtrack. The record was released on November 18, 2003, via Varèse Sarabande.

Release
Gothika was released on November 21, 2003, in North America, grossing $19.3 million in the opening weekend and ranking at #2, behind The Cat in the Hat. It went on to gross $59.7 million in the US and $81.9 million from foreign markets for a worldwide total of $141.6 million.

Critical response
The review aggregator site Rotten Tomatoes gave the film a 15% approval rating based on 169 reviews and an average rating of 4.1/10. The site's critical consensus reads, "Berry's acting talents can't save Gothika from its preposterous plot and bad dialogue." On Metacritic, the film has a score of 38 out of 100 based on 36 critics, indicating "generally unfavorable reviews". Audiences polled by CinemaScore gave the film an average grade of "B" on an A+ to F scale.

A more positive review came from Roger Ebert of The Chicago Sun-Times, who gave the film 3 out of 4 stars. He wrote that "the plot is preposterous" but nonetheless felt that stylish direction and Berry's performance made Gothika enjoyable on its own "lurid" terms: "The casting of Halle Berry is useful to the movie, because she evokes a vulnerable quality that triggers our concern. Hitchcock might have wanted to work with her. He didn't cast so much for acting ability as for an innate quality."

Home media 
Gothika was released on VHS and DVD by Warner Home Video on March 2, 2004. The initial DVD release was available in both widescreen and fullscreen editions. A two-disc special edition DVD, featuring additional documentaries and bonus features, was subsequently released in October 2004. The film was released on Blu-ray by Warner Bros. on September 25, 2007.

Awards

Won 
 2004 Teen Choice Awards
 Choice Movie Actress - Drama/Action Adventure - Halle Berry

Nominated 
 2004 Black Reel Awards
 Best Actress - Halle Berry
 2004 Golden Trailer Award
 Best Horror/Thriller
 2004 Image Awards
 Outstanding Actress in a Motion Picture - Halle Berry
 Outstanding Supporting Actor in a Motion Picture - Charles S. Dutton
 2004 MTV Movie Awards
 Best Female Performance - Halle Berry
 2004 Teen Choice Awards
 Choice Movie – Thriller

See also
 List of ghost films

References

External links
 
 
 
 
 
 

2003 films
2003 horror films
2000s ghost films
2000s horror thriller films
2000s psychological horror films
2003 psychological thriller films
2000s serial killer films
American ghost films
American horror thriller films
American psychological horror films
American psychological thriller films
American rape and revenge films
American serial killer films
American supernatural horror films
American supernatural thriller films
Columbia Pictures films
Dark Castle Entertainment films
Films about psychiatry
Films about spirit possession
Films directed by Mathieu Kassovitz
Films produced by Joel Silver
Films scored by John Ottman
Films set in Connecticut
Films set in psychiatric hospitals
Films shot in Montreal
Mariticide in fiction
Films about snuff films
Warner Bros. films
2000s English-language films
Films produced by Robert Zemeckis
2000s American films